Oringer is a surname. Notable people with the surname include:

Jon Oringer (born 1974), American programmer, photographer, and businessman
Ken Oringer (born 1965), American chef